Rugby league sevens at the 2009 Pacific Mini Games was held from 5–6 September 2009 at Marist St. Joseph's Stadium. Fiji won the gold medal, defeating hosts the Cook Islands in the final by 20–12. Samoa took the bronze medal, defeating Tonga by 26–24 in the third place match.

Results

Preliminary games

Semi Finals (1v4 ; 2v3)

Bronze-medal match

Gold-medal match

Final standings

References

2009 Pacific Mini Games
2009
2009 in rugby league